The list of ship commissionings in 1909 includes a chronological list of all ships commissioned in 1909.


See also 

1909
 Ship commissionings